Strigoderma is a genus of shining leaf chafers in the family Scarabaeidae. There are about 9 described species in Strigoderma.

Species
 Strigoderma arbicola (Fabricius, 1793) (sand chafer)
 Strigoderma costulipennis Bates, 1888
 Strigoderma knausi (Brown, 1925)
 Strigoderma pimalis Casey, 1884
 Strigoderma protea Burmeister, 1844
 Strigoderma pygmaea (Fabricius, 1798) (pygmy chafer)
 Strigoderma sulcipennis Burmeister, 1844
 Strigoderma teapensis Bates, 1888
 Strigoderma vestita Burmeister, 1844

References

Further reading

 
 
 

Rutelinae